Syriac Union Party may refer to:

Syriac Union Party (Lebanon)
Syriac Union Party (Syria)